Royalists is the name given to supporters of Ségolène Royal, the party's 2007 presidential candidate. Royal narrowly lost the Reims Congress vote on First Secretary to Martine Aubry.

Notable Royalists include Gérard Collomb, Jean-Noël Guérini, Gaëtan Gorce, Jean-Louis Bianco, Julien Dray, Vincent Peillon, Aurélie Filippetti, Georges Frêche, Hélène Mandroux, Jean-Jack Queyranne, François Rebsamen and Manuel Valls.

See also
Desires for the Future

Factions of the Socialist Party (France)
Political party factions in France